Galaxy 5000: Racing in the 51st Century is a racing video game developed by Activision for the Nintendo Entertainment System.

Summary
This video game takes place in the future using an outer space atmosphere. It features the racing of futuristic craft that can battle each other for finishing spots in the race. Each craft is also upgradeable and with each upgrade comes better shielding and weapons. This video game would become the inspiration for the Super NES video game Rock n' Roll Racing. Primitive voice effects are used when the ships collide with each other; three of the phrases are: "Hey!," "Excuse me!," and "Watch it."

Reviews

8-Bit Central gave Galaxy 5000 a thumbs basically saying that its a “fun” game while praising the game’s “crafty” driving.

References

External links
Galaxy 5000 at IGN

1991 video games
Activision games
Science fiction racing games
Nintendo Entertainment System games
Nintendo Entertainment System-only games
Science fiction video games
Video games scored by Russell Lieblich
Video games developed in the United States